Cookstown High School is a combined Grammar School and Secondary School in Northern Ireland. It is one of the largest in the area, falling within the Southern Region of the Education Authority Northern Ireland.

Unlike many grammar providers in Northern Ireland the school does not make use of extra transfer tests instead it offers children grammar provision on the basis of their academic ability as evidenced through their primary school attainment.

History and development 
Founded as Cookstown Academy in 1806 by Rev Thomas Miller Senior the school has been through numerous transformations in the centuries since then.  It merged with the Ladies Boarding School in the town around 1924 by which time it was known as Cookstown College. The school was renamed Cookstown High School in 1934 by which time it was a grammar school.  In 1955 a new, state of the art building was erected for it in Coolnafranky Demesne and placed adjacent to a newly created School, Cookstown Secondary Intermediate School.  These two schools shared the site and some facilities until the nineteen seventies.

In 1977 the two schools merged into one taking the badge and motto of the grammar school with a slightly amended uniform. Today's school has retained its academic tradition and focus while also providing vocational pathways to ensure that all pupils are able to access the curriculum.  Pupils are placed on differentiated pathways guided by their academic ability and educational needs.

Site 
The school is situated on the Coolnafranky site in Cookstown. This site is one of the largest in Northern Ireland and is dominated by a large nineteenth-century gentleman's residence named Coolnafranky House.  The house is a listed building and provides accommodation for Sixth Form study, the school nurse, a kitchen and numerous meeting rooms.  The school site is wooded and has extensive green areas. In addition to numerous tennis courts it also contains the two artificial turf pitches used by the school and by Cookstown Hockey Club.  It is the only school in Northern Ireland to have two full sized hockey pitches (one sand based, one water based).

The school has five main buildings:

 Block 1: The 'Upper' Building, housing the Technology, ICT, Art, English, History, Religious Education, Physical Education, Home Economics, Geography, Business Studies and Health and Social Care Departments.
 Block 2: The Morrison (Middle) Building - General Office, Principal's and Vice-Principals' offices, 2 school restaurants, the Music Department and the Sixth Form Centre, comprising a common room and study areas. 
 Block 3: The 'Lower' Building - Modern Languages (French, German, Spanish), Maths, and Biology and Physics departments.
 Block 4: The Learning Support Unit and changing rooms for the pitches.
 Block 5: New Science Building (Chemistry Block).

Motto 
The school's motto is "Virtus Cum Scientia" which means "character through knowledge".  The school hymn is "Lead Me, Lord, Lead Me in Thy Righteousness" by Samuel Sebastian Wesley.

Headteachers 
Cookstown Academy
 Rev T Millar (Founder) 1806–1840
 Mr John A Smyth BA, 1840–1861
 Mr John McKenzie MA, 1877–1901
 Mr J Rutledge BA, 1910*
 Mr W J Vaughan BA, 1917*
Cookstown Ladies School'
 Misses Remington, 1934*
 Miss Matilda Miller, 1861
 Misses Houston, 1877–1918
 Miss Rowan, BA 1918*
Cookstown High School
 Mr A McNeill BA, 1934–1959
 Mr J C Cooper BSc, 1959–1971
 Canon W Young O.B.E., MA, 1971–1977
Cookstown Secondary Intermediate School
 Mr J E Donaghey BA, 1955–1974
 Mr W K Armstrong BSc, 1974–1977 
Cookstown High School
 Canon Wilfred Young O.B.E. (1971–1990)
 Dr Samuel McGuinness (1991–1997)
 Mr Keith Hamilton (Acting Principal) (1997–1998)
 Mr Barry Freestone (1998–2006)
 Mrs Adele Sloan (2007–2013)
 Mr Graham Montgomery (2013–2018)
 Miss Gwyneth Evans (2018-)

Magazine 

Every year Cookstown High releases a publication chronicling the successes of the school, changes within the teaching staff and any significant achievements by the school's pupils.
The Editorial Team is led by Mrs Leanne Johnston, who is assisted by a team of pupils. Reports and pictures are included of the Year 8 pupils, Year 13+14 pupils and of all pupils' academic, social, extra curricular and sporting achievements in the school, including the concert band and choirs.

For the school year 2006–2007, the style of the magazine was reverted to its original A4 size, which had been abandoned in 2003.

CHS sport 

Sport is a fundamental part of life at the high school.  Sports offered at the school include football, netball, hockey, rugby union, cross-country running and athletics.

The school is known for its preference for hockey. In previous seasons (notably 2008–09), the 1st XI have won the McCullough Cup and Burney Cup, both for the second year running, beating Sullivan Upper and Banbridge Academy in the finals respectively. However the boys lost their Irish Schools crown after losing 3-2 to St. Andrews College, Dublin. They were to avenge this defeat at the end of season inaugural John Waring All Ireland Schoolboys Championships, when they defeated St. Andrews College in the final by 2 goals to nil.

In 2007–2008, the boy's first team won the All Ireland Schoolboys Hockey Championship when they defeated the holders Banbridge Academy by four goals to two in the final. This was followed six weeks later by a penalty shoot-out victory over the same opponents in the Final of the McCullough Cup. The boys capped a terrific season by completing the treble by winning the Burney Cup against Royal & Prior. This marked the first season the school had achieved this feat.

In the 2006–2007 season, the boys first team reached the semi-final of both the McCullough Cup and the All Ireland Schoolboys Hockey Championship, and the final of the Burney Cup.

School traditions 

There are a number of annual events at the high School.  Prize Day is a tradition within the school where those pupils, who have excelled in their studies, are formally congratulated and rewarded on their successes. There is an academic procession with teaching staff wearing academic dress and a special guest is invited to speak.  Typically held in the third or fourth week of the new school year, it celebrates those who have excelled in their Year 8, Year 9, Year 10, Year 11, GCSE, AS and A-Level studies, along with those who have excelled when it comes to sporting achievements and contributions to school life.

The School Formal Dinner Dance is held in October.  This event is organized by the Head Boy and Head Girl. It is attended by hundreds of pupils from Sixth Form and Year Twelve as well as many members of staff.

In November a Service of Remembrance is held at the school war memorial.  The memorial was dedicated in 2013 in memory of former pupils and staff who died in the service of their country. It was designed by local artist Mr George Gourley a past pupil and former Head of Art at the school. Wreaths are laid on behalf of pupils, the Former Pupils Association and the Parent Teachers and Friends Association.  It is attended by members of the school community and representatives of civic society.

Each year the CHS Society for Music and Drama presents a play or musical in the Upper Hall. Performances usually run over two or three nights in December and up to one hundred pupils and staff regularly participate.  The Director is Mrs Linda Armstrong and the Musical Director Mrs Fiona Gormley, Head of Music.

On the last day of the Christmas term pupils and staff walk to Molesworth Church for the Carol service.  The school choirs sing and music is provided by the school band.  Lessons are read by Senior Prefects and representatives of the wider school community.  Governors and guests are afterwards entertained to festive food in Coolnafranky House.

The Spring Concert is usually held close to Easter and offers an opportunity for pupils involved in music to showcase their talent across a range of genres.  The event is co-hosted by the Head Boy and Head Girl.

Each term ends with a ‘Final Assembly’. At this event senior staff present awards that have been won for pupil achievement and update the school community on the progress of the house competition. In the summer term this assembly includes farewells to departing staff and the presentation of the Year Eight House Cup and the House Cup for the overall winner.

Notable former pupils

 Stuart Dallas, represented Northern Ireland at Euro 2016.
 Aaron Hughes, represented Northern Ireland at Euro 2016.
 Nick Laird, novelist.
 Ernest Walton (1903–1995); Nobel Prize in Physics (1951); known for his part in "splitting the atom".
 Jimmy Kennedy, OBE (1902–1984); songwriter and lyricist.
 Sir Allen McClay,  pharmacist and entrepreneur.
 Martin Sloan, captained Ireland at the 1990 Men's Hockey World Cup.
 Ian Sloan, represented Great Britain at the 2016 Summer Olympics.
 David Ames, represented Great Britain at the 2016 Summer Olympics.
 Robert Huey, Chief Veterinary Officer for Northern Ireland

Sources 

Secondary schools in County Tyrone
1806 establishments in Ireland
High School